Hippurites cornuvaccinum is a fossil saltwater clam, an extinct marine bivalve mollusk in the family Hippuritidae. These fossils occur in the Late Cretaceous deposits of southern Europe.

References
 Global Names Index
Sepkoski's Online Genus Database
Zipcodezoo
Europeana
Henry Wood   Palaeontology Invertebrate

Hippuritidae
Prehistoric bivalves
Cretaceous bivalves
Bivalves described in 1831